Wesley John Bialosuknia (June 8, 1945 – October 23, 2013) was an American basketball player. He was a 6'2" (1.88 m) 185 lb (84 kg) guard, and played collegiately for the University of Connecticut Huskies.  An accurate and prolific medium- and long-range jump shooter, Bialosuknia still holds the University of Connecticut season and career scoring average records: his 1966–67 average of 28.0 PPG ranked 5th in the nation. He also holds the UConn records for career scoring average of 23.6 pts per game and consecutive foul shots made (43).  In 1967, he was the MVP of the annual North–South College All-Star Game.

He was selected by the St. Louis Hawks in the 4th round (37th pick overall) of the 1967 NBA draft and by the Oakland Oaks in the 1967 ABA Draft.

He played for the Oakland Oaks (1967–68) for 70 games and was variously nicknamed "The Mad Bomber" or "The Typographical Terror"; Bialosuknia finished 2nd in the league in 3-point shooting percentage, and his 9 consecutive 3-pointers made is tied for the most in ABA history.

Bialosuknia died at the age of 68 on October 23, 2013.

References

External links

 College Stats from sports-reference
 REALGM.com profile

1945 births
2013 deaths
American men's basketball players
Basketball players from New York (state)
Hartford Capitols players
Oakland Oaks draft picks
Oakland Oaks players
People from Hyde Park, New York
Shooting guards
Sportspeople from Poughkeepsie, New York
St. Louis Hawks draft picks
UConn Huskies men's basketball players